Dolichovespula norvegicoides is a species of social wasp occurring from Central California, to Canada, and Alaska.

References

Vespidae
Insects described in 1918